San Paragorio is a church located outside the Medieval walls of the town of Noli, province of Savona. It is an important monument of Romanesque architecture and it is ranked among the most beautiful buildings of this style to be seen in Liguria. It is an Italian national monument since 1890.

Architecture and history of the church 

The church has two phases of use: Paleochristian (5th–6th century) and Romanesque (11th century). It is dedicated to St. Paragorius, a saint who fled with his companions from Libia, to escape from persecution under Diocletian (end of the 3rd century), took refuge in Corsica, in the town of Calenzana, and there was martyred. In the 5th–6th century his relics were taken to Noli, as the island was threatened with invasions of Vandals. Presence of the remains of the saint resulted in development of the religious complex. It was restored by an architect Alfredo D'Andrade after the earthquake of 1887.

The entrance is found on the left side of the church. The white and black coloring of the portal (from 13th century) matches the gothic protruding porch, made of stone and bricks, supported by two columns. To the left of the entrance located are two monumental arcosolium tombs (13th–14th century). Still can be seen some traces of frescos attributed to celebrated Lombardian artists. On the right of the protruding porch situated is the tomb of Gandolfo De Gasco (1272), as can be read from the Gothic inscription. Between the church and the surrounding wall can be seen four Paleochristian sarcophagi (5th–7th centuries), discovered during the archaeological excavations. It is worth noting that the central apse is decorated with eleven Islamic bowls, above the row of small blind arches. These decorative elements (recently taken for restoration, the present ones are copies) are among the most ancient walled bowls in Liguria (from about 1050 AD).
Important archaeological excavations were carried in the 70's by Nino Lamboglia in the area around the church. Found were remains of a Paleochristan baptistery and late antique necropolis. Later excavations under the Ligurian Archaeological Superintendence showed also remains of a settlement of craftsmen and of the early church edifice (6th century).

The church is subdivided into three naves with semi-circular apses. The central nave is separated by massive pillars, decorated with different forms, supporting large semi-circular arches. The roof above the central nave rests on decorative wooden trusses (an original piece is exposed on the back wall of the left nave). The presbytery can be reached along a ramp. It is decorated with fifteen tall niches resting on a bench running all along the central apse. In these niches visible are three 15th-century fresco paintings: in the rectangular central niche there is a crucifix, and in the two lateral niches there are the images of St. Peter and St. Paul. On the left wall of the presbytery we can see a marble Renaissance tabernacle carrying the donor's name, the bishop of Noli, Vincenzo Boverio (bishop of years 1506–1519, from family of pope Julian II). To the right of the altar there is a copy of the bishop's cathedra (throne, from 1239). On its wooden back engraved is the crest of the Genoese bishop of Noli, Paolo Giustiniani (bishop of years 1459–1485). The crypt can be reached by descending the stairs to either side of the presbytery. The place became a crypt only in the 11th century, during the erection of the Romanesque church. Previously, in these place stood two little chapels, built in the 4th–5th century directly on the sandy ground (that is three meters down from present ground level). Inside it is possible to see Roman monolithic columns, reused as support by Medieval builders. Coming back to the ground floor, in the right nave, can be seen an octagonal baptismal font for full immersion (rebuilt in 1889). Also on the right, closer to the presbytery, exposed is a beautifully painted wooden crucifix, namely "Holy Face", with a sculpture of martyred Jesus in characteristic long surplice (colobium) of oriental origin (dated to 12th century). Nearby stands the pulpit, also rebuild in 1889, from several remaining marble panels. Under the pulpit exposed is a round tomb stone, made from slate and marble (decoration style unique to Liguria), that remembers Domino Verdane (nobleman from Noli, 1296). On the walls of the side naves visible are 15th–16th-century paintings, among them the one by Teramo Piaggio, representing St. Paragorius on a horse with his three brothers in faith, Parteo, Partenopeo and Severino, with the Virgin and the Child.

Gallery

External links 

 Official site of the church

References 

Lamboglia, N.
1973 Gli scavi di S. Paragorio e il problema delle origini di Noli, Rivista di Studi Liguri, pp. 64–71

Varaldo, C.
1978 La chiesa di S. Paragorio a Noli e la zona archeologica, Savona

Romanesque architecture in Liguria
Tourist attractions in Liguria
Churches in the province of Savona
11th-century Roman Catholic church buildings in Italy